Kandula Obula Reddy Gundlakamma Reservoir Project is an irrigation project across the Gundlakamma River located in Prakasam district in Andhra Pradesh, India. The dam, with 56 million cubic meters of live storage capacity, is located across the Gundlakamma River.  It now supplies 100 acres out of the total envisaged area of 80,000. This reservoir also supplies drinking water to the nearby Ongole city.

References

Irrigation in Andhra Pradesh
Buildings and structures in Prakasam district